Edvaldo Goncalves Pereira, more commonly known as Edvaldo, is a Brazilian football (soccer) player, currently playing for Chiangrai United  in the Thai Division 1 League. During his career he has played for Botafogo-SP (Brazil), Maritimo and Farense (Portugal), Toluca (Mexico),  St-Gallen (Switzerland), Shanghai Shenhua (China) and Defensor Sporting (Uruguay).

References

External links
 Official Website
 
 

1974 births
Living people
Brazilian footballers
Botafogo Futebol Clube (SP) players
S.C. Farense players
Expatriate footballers in Thailand
Port F.C. players
Brazilian expatriate sportspeople in Thailand
Association football forwards
People from São João de Meriti
Sportspeople from Rio de Janeiro (state)